Devendorf Park is a city park that occupies the block of Ocean Avenue and Junipero Street, Carmel-by-the-Sea, Monterey County, California, United States. The park is Carmel's central gathering place for outdoor events. The nearest larger town is Pebble Beach, California. The park is close to downtown shopping, the Carmel beach, and California State Route 1.

The park is sparsely populated and shaded by several live oaks. Flowers beds are located at the entry points at the corner of Ocean Avenue and Junipero Street. The city of Carmel holds special events in the park to mark the holidays. These include an annual Easter egg event, Veterans Day, Memorial Day, Fourth of July, the Halloween parade and pumpkin roll, and holiday tree lighting. It has a public restroom and a water fountain. No dogs are allowed in the park. Devendorf Park was recorded with the National Register of Historic Places on July 25, 2002.

History

In 1921, a group of Carmel citizens lobbied the city to purchase  of dunes from James Franklin Devendorf, to preserve it for future generations. In 1922, the city approved the price set at $15,000. The purchase included the dunes, the Carmel beach, and Block 69, now Devendorf Park. For some time, the block served as a polo field, horseshoe pit, campground, and fairground. In 1928, the Mattie Hopper, wife of James Hopper, raised funds to support the park. In 1930, councilwoman Clara Kellogg and persuaded the city council to make it official by naming the park after James Devendorf.

Michael J. Murphy gave a hundred yards of top soil for the project and Dr. R. A. Kocher provided Carmel stone and benches. Jane Deusner was the Carmel landscape architect and Jane Todd of Monterey selected the plants and materials. By 1932, planting had begun for the Devendorf Park.

In 1937, as part of a WPA project, a redwood carving of Father Junípero Serra was designed by Carmel resident and sculptor Remo Scardigli and placed in the park.

Devendorf's daughter, Edwina Dupre Devendorf (1881-1954), became a painter and sculptor. She made a bronze bust of her father that was dedicated to the park in 1949 with a plague saying:

A World War II memorial plague was placed in the park by the American Legion Post No. 512.

In the 1970s, rules were put in place to not allow anyone to sit or lie on the grass at the Devendorf Park, because "so many people have abused our little park." Today, you are allowed to sit and have lunch or take a nap on the grass. In January 1971, the park made national news when the California Supreme Court overturned the "no sitting" law.

In 1986, Public restrooms were added to the northeast corner of the park on the Sixth Avenue side. The bathrooms exteriors are layered with Carmel stone, which match the boarder walls surrounding the park.

Climate

Devendorf Park experiences a cool summer Mediterranean climate (Köppen climate classification Csb) normal in coastal areas of California. Summers are typically mild, with overcast mornings produced by marine layer clouds which can bring drizzles that typically give way to clear skies in the afternoon.

Gallery

References

External links

 Devendorf Park
 Downtown Carmel-by-the-Sea In One Hour - A Walking Tour

 

 
Parks in Monterey County, California